Montereau-Fault-Yonne, or simply Montereau, is a commune in the Seine-et-Marne department in the Île-de-France region in north-central France.

Geography
Montereau-Fault-Yonne straddles the confluence of the rivers Yonne and Seine at the far south-east of the Île-de-France region, 70 km southeast of its administrative centre, Paris. The A5 autoroute (Paris–Troyes–Chaumont) passes northeast of the town. Montereau station links by rail Laroche-Migennes, Melun and Paris.  It is approximately equidistant between slightly larger Melun and Sens.

Name
The city takes its name from its geographical position on the confluence of the Yonne and the Seine rivers. , also spelled  comes from the verb  ("to fail") in its old meaning to fall. Montereau is where the Yonne falls into the Seine.

Sights

The town is split in three by the rivers,  situated on the southern shore and Surville on the hill to the north. The old town centre is located in  while Surville is an assembly of high rise buildings, erected after World War II, and is in many ways a typical  in the Île-de-France. Some of these high rise buildings are now (2005) going to be destroyed and replaced by individual houses. The old château-park in Surville (now the site of a high school Lycée André Malraux) however gives a very nice view over the confluent and the Seine-et-Marne region.
On the east side, between the two rivers, are the port and an industrial park.

History
In 1359, the King of Navarre Charles II of Navarre, who held the town because of his Champagne ascent, lost it to the regent of France (the future king Charles V).

John the Fearless was killed on the town's bridge in September, 1419 by Tanneguy du Chastel and the sire de Barbazan, during a conference with the dauphin (who became in 1422 Charles VII). An inscription on the bridge recalls the event. In the collegiate church Notre-Dame-et-Saint-Loup there is a sword which has long been said to be John the Fearless', but actually this sword is certainly more recent.

In 1420, Philip the Good, the son of John the Fearless, seized the town, which remained for eight years in the hands of the Anglo-Burgundian coalition. However, at the end of a long siege, the king Charles VII, helped by Jacques de Chabannes and Jean de Dunois, managed to take it again.

In 1567, during the Wars of Religion, Condé briefly seized the town.

In 1587, the inhabitants of Montereau sided with the Catholic League, but in 1590 they accepted the legitimacy of the new king Henry IV.

Montereau was also the place of one of the last victories of Napoleon on 14 February 1814.

In January 2012, the mayor proposed development of Napoleon's Bivouac, a commemorative theme park at a projected cost of 200 million euros. The plans remain in dispute and nothing has been built.

Demographics
Inhabitants of Montereau-Fault-Yonne are called . The urban area of Montereau-Fault-Yonne has 29,458 inhabitants (2018).

Hospital 
Montereau has a campus of the Centre hospitalier Sud Seine et Marne.

Economy
Historically, the city has sported a strong industrial base and thus has strong blue collar roots. In recent decades, unemployment has become an increasing problem, especially within the immigrant community in Surville.

Twin towns
Montereau is twinned with the British town of Otley, north of Leeds.

See also
 Communes of the Seine-et-Marne department

References

External links

 1999 Land Use, from IAURIF (Institute for Urban Planning and Development of the Paris-Île-de-France région) 
 

Communes of Seine-et-Marne